The Oasis Shopping Centre is located on the Broadbeach Mall in Broadbeach, Gold Coast, Queensland, Australia.

It was purchased by Brookfield Asset Management in 2012 from Thakral Holdings. In March 2015 it was purchased by Abacus Property Group and KKR.

History
The site was a former mineral sand mine before construction of the Lennons Broadbeach Hotel in 1955. The hotel was demolished in 1987 and the site redeveloped into the Oasis Centre opening on 29 August 1989.

Stores and services
In addition to retail stores, the centre has doctors, dentists, and fitness, massage, yoga, accounting, financial and legal advisers, a Language school and travel club.

Monorail
The Oasis Monorail connected the beach, shopping, Sofitel Gold Coast resort and Jupiters Hotel & Casino. It had two stations on level 2 of The Oasis and a station at Jupiters Hotel & Casino. Originally known as the Gol'Coasta, the monorail opened to passengers in 1989 along with the shopping centre. In 2001, the operator acquired the majority of the track and the trains originally used at the Merry Hill Shopping Centre in England. In late 2013, the monorail closed for maintenance reopening to passengers on 18 December 2014. It closed on 29 January 2017.

References

External links
Oasis Shopping Centre

Shopping centres on the Gold Coast, Queensland
Von Roll Holding people movers
Monorails in Australia
Broadbeach, Queensland
Kohlberg Kravis Roberts companies
Shopping malls established in 1989
1989 establishments in Australia